JFK Stadium is a sport stadium in Springfield, Missouri. The facility is used by Evangel University and local high schools for American football, track and field, and soccer. It is also host to other university and city athletic and non-athletic events. It was named for former United States President John F. Kennedy.

See also
 List of memorials to John F. Kennedy

References

External links

College football venues
American football venues in Missouri
Monuments and memorials to John F. Kennedy in the United States